Alex Jones (born October 17, 1987) is an American professional basketball player for Iwate Big Bulls in Japan. He played college basketball for Seattle Redhawks.

References

1987 births
Living people
American expatriate basketball people in Germany
American expatriate basketball people in Japan
American men's basketball players
Basketball players from Phoenix, Arizona
Centers (basketball)
Earth Friends Tokyo Z players
Ibaraki Robots players
Junior college men's basketball players in the United States
Koshigaya Alphas players
NINERS Chemnitz players
Nishinomiya Storks players
Scottsdale Community College alumni
Seattle Redhawks men's basketball players
Tokyo Cinq Rêves players
Tokyo Hachioji Bee Trains players
Toyotsu Fighting Eagles Nagoya players